Cameron Lefresne (born 30 June 1994) is a male international Canadian lawn bowler.

Bowls career

World Championships
In 2020, he was selected for the 2020 World Outdoor Bowls Championship in Australia.

Commonwealth Games
Lefresne competed in the triples and fours at the 2018 Commonwealth Games held in the Gold Coast, Queensland. In 2022, he competed in the men's triples and the men's fours at the 2022 Commonwealth Games.

Asia Pacific
Lefresne won a bronze medal in the fours with Rob Law, Pat Bird and Greg Wilson at the 2019 Asia Pacific Bowls Championships, held in the Gold Coast, Queensland.

References

External links
 Cameron Lefresne at Bowls Canada
 
 

1994 births
Living people
Canadian male bowls players
Commonwealth Games competitors for Canada
Bowls players at the 2018 Commonwealth Games
Bowls players at the 2022 Commonwealth Games
20th-century Canadian people
21st-century Canadian people